Mithuna arizana is a moth in the subfamily Arctiinae first described by Alfred Ernest Wileman in 1911. It is found in Taiwan.

The wingspan is 20–25 mm.

References

Moths described in 1911
Lithosiini
Moths of Taiwan